Jian Bozan (April 14, 1898 – December 18, 1968) was a Chinese scholar and Marxist historian of Uyghur descent. Born in Taoyuan County, Hunan Province, Jian became an early supporter of the Communist Party of China. From 1952 to his death, he was Vice President of Peking University. Like many authoritative academic figures of his generation, he was persecuted during the Cultural Revolution over a perceived divergence between his own ideas and that of dominant Maoist orthodoxy of the time. Unable to bear torture, Jian committed suicide in 1968.

Biography

Genealogical descent

"Jian" is very unusual surname in China. Jian Bozan traced his ancestry to a Uyghur general who served the Emperor of the Ming Dynasty in quelling the earliest of the Miao rebellions in southeastern China. The Emperor rewarded his family with the surname  "Jian" and married him to his god-daughter, the Duyi Princess. The Jian family then settled in Taoyuan County in Hunan province for generations, gradually integrating into Han Chinese culture.

Early years and education
In 1916, Jian entered school in Beijing, where he studied and conducted research about Chinese economic history.  His graduation thesis was a 50,000-character study of the history of China's currency system. Believing that industry was China's savior, he travelled to the University of California in 1924 to research economics.  During this time, he studied Anti-Dühring, The Origin of the Family, Private Property, and the State, The Communist Manifesto, and other famous Marxist works.  He returned to China in 1926. Jian was a patriot, and participated in the protests leading up to the March 18 Massacre of that year. He published his first Marxist interpretation of Chinese history during the 1930s, and joined the Communist Party of China in 1937. In 1934, while serving as secretary to Qin Zhen, deputy head of the Judicial Yuan, Jian went on a tour of numerous countries around the world. As a close ally of the Communist Party, Jian became professor of history at Peking University after the party's rise to power in 1949, and later served as dean of the faculty of history and vice-president of the university.

During the Cultural Revolution
Jian became a target of struggle during the early stages of the Cultural Revolution.  During the early 1960s, Jian began to advocate historical accounts that combined the methodology of class analysis and historicism.  For this, Mao Zedong criticized Jian at the end of 1965.  Qi Benyu, a prominent Maoist figure of the time period, also criticized Jian on four counts: opposing the theory of class struggle, denigrating peasant revolutions, praising emperors and kings, and applauding conciliatory policies.  Jian also suffered from severe torture and was lynched at the hands of radicals. The ill treatment  drove Jian to commit suicide.  Jian, along with his wife, took an overdose of sleeping pills and died on December 18, 1968.

Jian was posthumously rehabilitated in 1978, at the behest of Deng Xiaoping.

Abridged list of publications
 Treatise on Chinese History
 Discussions of Historical Questions
 Anthology of Historical Works by Jian Bozan
 Historical Data and the Study of History
 Recent Capitalist Economy of the World
 A Course in the Philosophy of History
 An Outline of Chinese History
 History of the Qin and Han Dynasties
 Timeline of Chinese and Foreign History
 General Reference on Chinese History

See also
Wu Han
Chen Boda

References

Republic of China historians
People's Republic of China historians
Suicides during the Cultural Revolution
Uyghurs
1898 births
1968 suicides
People from Changde
Historians from Hunan
20th-century Chinese historians
Delegates to the 1st National People's Congress
Drug-related suicides in China
National Wuhan University alumni
Joint suicides